The International Journal for Parasitology is an international medical journal published for the Australian Society for Parasitology by Elsevier. The journal includes original research articles, reviews, and commentary relating to parasites and their host interactions.

External links 
 
 Australian Society for Parasitology

Parasitology journals
Publications established in 1971
Elsevier academic journals
English-language journals
Journals published between 13 and 25 times per year